Hit(s) Collection may refer to:

Hits Collection, compilation album by Atahualpa Yupanqui
Hits Collection, compilation album by Dusty Springfield
Hits Collection, compilation album by Culture Club
Hit Collection, compilation album by Boney M.

See also
The Hits Collection (disambiguation)